Jambukeswarar Temple, Thiruvanaikaval (also Thiruvanaikal, Jambukeswaram) is a famous Shiva temple in Tiruchirapalli (Trichy) district, in the state of Tamil Nadu, India. Though it is that  Kocengannan (Kochengat Cholan), one of the Early Cholas, have built this temple. It is located in the Srirangam island, which has the famous Ranganathaswamy temple.

Thiruvanaikal is one of the five major Shiva Temples of Tamil Nadu (Pancha Bhoota Stalam) representing the Mahābhūta or five great elements; this temple represents the element of water, or neer in Tamil.  The sanctum of Jambukeswara has an  underground water stream and in spite of pumping water out, it is always filled with water.

It is one of the 275 Paadal Petra Sthalams, where all the four most revered Nayanars (Saivite Saints) have sung glories of the deity in this temple.  The temple has inscriptions from the Chola period.

Story behind the temple
Once Parvati mocked Shiva's penance for betterment of the world. Shiva wanted to condemn her act and directed her to go to the earth from Kailasam (Shiva's abode) to do penance. Parvathi in the form of Akilandeswari as per Shiva's wish found Jambu forest (Thiruvanaikoil) to conduct her penance. She made a lingam out of water of river Cauvery (also called as river Ponni) under the Venn Naaval tree (the Venn Naaval tree on top of the saint Jambu) and commenced her worship. The lingam is known as Appu Lingam (Water Lingam). Siva at last gave darshan to Akilandeswari and taught her Siva Gnana. Akilandeswari took Upadesa (lessons) facing East from Shiva, who stood facing west.

There were two Siva Ganas (Siva's disciples who live in Kailash): 'Malyavan' and 'Pushpadanta'. Though they are Siva Ganas they always quarrel with each other and fight for one thing or other. In one fight 'Malyavan' cursed 'Pushpadanta' to become an elephant on earth and the latter cursed the former to become a spider on earth. The elephant and the spider came to Jambukeswaram and continued their Siva worship. The elephant collected water from river Cauvery and conducted ablution to the lingam under the Jambu tree (Eugenia jambolana, the java plum tree) daily. The spider constructed his web over the lingam to prevent dry leaves from dropping on it and prevent sunlight directly falling on it. When the elephant saw the web and thought it was dust on lingam. The elephant tore them and cleaned the lingam by pouring water and the practice continued daily. The spider became angry one day and crawled into the trunk of the elephant and bit the elephant to death, killing itself. Siva, in the form of Jambukeswara, moved by the deep devotion of the two, relieved them from the curse. As an elephant worshipped Siva here, this place came to be known as Thiru Aanai Kaa (thiru means holy, aanai is elephant, kaa (kaadu) means forest). Later the name 'Thiruaanaikaa' become 'Thiruvanaikaval' and 'Thiruvanaikoil'.

As an outcome of having committed a  sin by killing the elephant, in the next birth, the spider was born as the King Kochengot Chola (kotchengannan cholan meaning red-eyed king) and built 70 temples and this temple is the one among them. The account of the Chola building seventy temples along with this temple is mentioned in Nalayira Divya Prabandham. Remembering his enmity with the elephant in his previous birth, he built the  Siva Sannathi (sanctorum) such that not even a small elephant can enter. The entrance on the sanctorum of Jambukeswara is only 4 foot high and 2.5 foot wide.

There was a story behind the king's red eyes - When he was in his mother's womb the palace astrologer predicted a sacred time to give birth to enable the newborn's well-being. The queen went into labor early, before the time predicted by the astrologer. The queen hence told the servant to hang her upside down for the time to come so that she could have a wise and virtuous son who could head the kingdom righteously. This waiting time inside the womb made the baby's eyes red. After becoming the king, he built the temple for Siva and Goddess Akilandeswari in the name of Aanaikka (elephant protected) later days it changed to Thiruvanaikovil.

Architecture 

 The massive outer wall covering the fifth precinct, known as the Vibudi Prakara, stretches over a mile and is two feet thick and over 25 feet high. Legend maintains that the wall was built by Shiva working with the laborers. The fourth precinct contains a hall with 796 pillars and measures 2436 feet by 1493.  It also has a small tank fed by perpetual springs.  The third enclosure is 745 feet by 197 surrounded a wall 30 feet high.  This area has two gopurams (gateway towers) 73 and 100 feet tall, a coconut thoppu and a small water tank.  The second enclosure is 306 feet by 197, a gopuram 65 feet high and several small shrines.  The inner most enclosure measuring 126 feet by 123 has the sanctum.

The sanctum sanctorum is a square structure, found independently situated at the center of the innermost enclosure. There is a vimana on the roof of the sanctum. The structure is open on three sides, with a shallow moat separating it from the circumambulatory path of the innermost enclosure. The sthala-vriksham, or holy tree here is the White Jambuka (Tamil: வெண் நாவல் மரம்) (Syzygium cumini), found growing along the south-eastern wall of the sanctum sanctorum. The trunk of the tree is protected by a walled structure. The western side of the sanctum, from where the deity is viewed, is continuous with a large closed hall, the Mukha Mantapa, containing four-pillars and housing a bronze idol of Nandi. The Mukha Mantapa has a large, ornate western door gilded with silver that forms the principal entrance. There are two additional entrances to the Mukha Mantapa on the southern and North Eastern sides as well. A set of three steps descend to the level of the sanctum sanctorum from the Mukha Mantapa. 
The deity is viewed through a stone window that forms an integral part of the western face of the sanctum sanctorum. The window has nine viewing apertures, believed to represent the Navagraha. There is a panel in bas-relief over the window depicting the sthala puranam: The jambuka tree growing out of a meditating sage's head on the extreme right; the linga of Jambukeswarar under the tree; a spider and an elephant worshiping the linga along with the Goddess Parvati who stands to the left of the linga. The sanctum sanctorum is divided into the Ardha Mantapam or Antaralam (whose western wall bears the window) and the Garbha Griha where the deity of Jambukeswarar is housed. Entrance into the Sanctum is through a small door on the southern wall, about 4 feet in height. The Ardha Mantapa is about 4 feet X 4 feet and contains an idol of Goddess Parvati on the right side of the door to the Garbha Griha. Devotees are admitted in groups of six into the Ardha Mantapa during sevas like Abhishekam or on payment of a small fee. The Garbha Griha is a wider structure compared to the  Ardha Mantapa. At the center, the Brahma Sthana, is the self-manifested linga of Jambukeswarar. The upper conical part of the linga is of the color of copper, whereas the yoni-bhaga or the pedestal is of black granite. A brass ring is seen at the point of attachment of the linga to the pedestal. The height of the linga is about 3 feet from the floor of the sanctum. The Garbha Griha and the Ardha Mantapa are unadorned from the inside, the only source of illumination within the sanctum being ghee lamps.
A stream of water is said to emerge from the linga, which is usually demonstrated as the soaking wet clothes in which it is draped. The water flow increases significantly during the Monsoon.
The main deity of the temple is Jambukeswara, representing the element water.  Jambukeswara is depicted sitting under a jambu tree, which grows over a small stream that engulfs the deity during the rainy season. The temple is also considered the abode of goddess Akilandeswari, one of the forms of the goddess Parvati.  The greatest of works related to this temple include Tiruvanaikaval and Kilvelur Akshyalingaswamy temple. [Explain]

Goddess Akilandeshwari's shrine 

The temples idols are installed opposite to each other - Such temples are known as Upadesa Sthalams. As the Devi was like a student and Jambukeswara like a Guru (teacher) in this temple, there is no Thiru Kalyanam (marriage) conducted in this temple for Shiva and Parvathi, unlike the other Shiva temples. The sannathy of the goddess Akilandeshwari and the sannathy of Prasanna Vinayaka are in the shape of the pranava manthra called "Aum". It is believed that the Amman in the temple was in deep anger hence during one of Adi Sankara's visit he installed the Prasanna Ganapathy idol right opposite to her Sannathy and installed a pair of Sri Chakra thaatankas (ear-rings) to reduce her anger.

The sculpture of Ekapada Trimurti, an aspect of Shiva with the deities Vishnu and Brahma emerging from it, is present in the temple, which can be seen only in Thyagaraja Temple, Tiruvottiyur.

There are lot of inscriptions from various Chola kings from 11th - 12th century indicating grants to the temple. The temple was widely expanded by Hoysala king, Someswara, the son of Vira Narasimha.  During 1236-37 CE, he built a lot of shrines namely Vallaliswara, Padumalisvara, Vira Narasingeswara and Somleswara evidently named after his grandfather Ballalla II, grandmother Padmaladevei, father Vira Narasimha and aunt Somala Devi.  The 7-tiered rajagopuram is also believed to have constructed by the Hoysala king.  There are separate shrines beyond the temple compound namely Aadhi having a typical structure as the main shrines. The temple and its pagodas were subject to frequent conquest between French and English forces between 1751 and 1755 CE. The temple is being widely maintained by Vellalars and the Nattukottai Chettiars during the 19th and early 20th centuries.

Religious significance of the temple

Pancha Bhoota Sthalam (Sanskrit: पञ्चभूतस्थलानि Pañcabhūtasthalāni) refers to the five Shiva temples, each representing the manifestation of the five prime elements of nature - space, air, fire, water, earth. Pancha indicates five, Bhoota means elements and Sthala means place.  All these temples are located in South India with four of these temples at Tamil Nadu and one at Andhra Pradesh. The five elements are believed to be enshrined in the five lingams and each of the lingams representing Shiva in the temple have five different names based on the elements they represent. In the Thiruvaanaikaval temple, Shiva is said to have manifested himself in the form of water (Appu Lingam). The other four manifestations are Prithivi Lingam (representing land) at Ekambareswarar Temple, Akasa Lingam (representing sky) at Thillai Nataraja Temple, Chidambaram, Agni Lingam (representing fire) at Annamalaiyar Temple and Vayu Lingam (representing air) at Srikalahasti Temple.

Culture
In the third enclosure, there is a coconut grove having a small tank where the festival image of Vaishnavite Srirangam temple used to be brought one day a year.   As Akilandeswari worshipped Lord Shiva in this temple, even today at noon the 'Archakar' (priest) dresses like a female and does Pooja to Jambukeswara and 'PASU' (Cow).  The noon pooja is very famous and a host of pilgrims attend it every day.  A special variety of black cow, called Karum Pasu is used for the occasion. Annabhishekam to lingam (ablution with cooked rice) is a daily ritual performed in the temple. The temple is one of the hosts for the annual Natyanjali, a festival of classical Indian dance.  The temple has also a school for training nadhaswaram, a classical pipe instrument in Tamil Nadu.

There is a legend that Parvathi worshipped Shiva here and installed the idol in the sanctum. Following the legend, a priest performs the pooja every day. It is believed that Adi Sankara offered ear rings called Thadanga to Akilandeshwari. There are a total of nine waterbodies associated with the temple.

Administration
The temple is maintained and administered by the Hindu Religious and Charitable Endowments Department of the Government of Tamil Nadu.

Gallery

Notes

References

 

Shakti temples
Shiva temples in Tiruchirappalli district
Pancha Bhoota Stalam
Padal Petra Stalam
Hindu temples in Tiruchirappalli
Maadakkoil
Chola architecture
Dravidian architecture

ca:Thiruvanaikaval
es:Thiruvanaikaval
hi:अकिलन्देश्वरी मन्दिर, तिरुवनैकवल
te:జంబుకేశ్వరం